Caapiranga is a municipality located in the Brazilian state of Amazonas. Its population was 13,283 (2020) and its area is 9,457 km².

References

Municipalities in Amazonas (Brazilian state)
Road-inaccessible communities of Brazil